Hallows is an English surname deriving from the Old English word halh meaning "hollow". Notable people with the surname include:

 Charlie Hallows (1895-1972), English cricketer
 E. Harold Hallows (1904-1974), American jurist
 James Hallows (1873-1910), English cricketer
 John Hallows (1907-1963), English professional footballer
 Norman Hallows (1886-1968), English athlete

See also

 
 Hallowes (surname)

References